The MTV Video Music Award for Best Art Direction is a craft award given to both the artist as well as the art director of the music video. From 1984 to 2006, the award's full name was Best Art Direction in a Video, and after a brief removal in 2007, its name was shortened to its current form starting in 2008. The biggest winners are K. K. Barrett and Jan Houllevigue, both of whom won this award twice.

The most nominated art director is Tom Foden, who was nominated five times between 1993 and 2021.  Closely following him are Charles Infante, Laura Fox, and K. K. Barrett with four nominations each; and Bryan Jones and Nigel Phelps with three.

The performer whose videos have won the most awards is Red Hot Chili Peppers. However, Madonna's videos have received the most nominations with six.

No performer has won a Moonman in this category for their work as an art director. Jamie Hewlett ("Clint Eastwood"), Jack White ("Would You Fight for My Love?"), SZA ("The Weekend"), and ASAP Rocky ("Babushka Boi") are the only performers to have been nominated as their videos' art directors in this category.

Winners

References

MTV Video Music Awards
Awards established in 1984